The discography of Serbian recording artist and producer Gru contains 5 studio albums, 2 compilation albums and 8 singles and EP's. He debuted on the Serbian music scene in 1995 with his debut album Da li imaš pravo?, produced by Jugodisk, but rose to prominence with his 1996 release Gru 2, which became the most commercially successful album in Serbia to date, selling 4 million copies. All of his singles discography include vocals from featured artists, and it's featured in the documentary done as a collective work with other hip-hop vocalists titled Stani na put. Despite that, he wrote, produced and arranged most of the songs featured in his discography. His first compilation album retains songs from his Između redova album, whereas Andonov's second released compilation album, The Ultimate Collection, contains his most critically acclaimed work.

Albums

Singles

Compilation albums

See also
Music of Serbia
Serbian hip hop

External links
Gru's Official Instagram

References

Discography
Hip hop discographies
Discographies of Serbian artists